Gabicce Mare Lighthouse is an active lighthouse located in Gabicce Mare, on the mole of the east side of Tavollo river that marks the border between Emilia-Romagna and the Marche on the Adriatic Sea.

Description
The first lighthouse was built in 1882 and consisted of a wooden construction at the end of the pier. A 1-storey equipment building is enclosed at the base of the tower which is painted in white and black horizontal bands. The lighthouse is completely automated and operated by the Marina Militare with the identification code number 3996 E.F.

See also
 List of lighthouses in Italy
 Gabicce Mare

References

External links

 Servizio Fari Marina Militare

Lighthouses in Italy
Lighthouses completed in 1882
Lighthouses completed in 1960
1882 establishments in Italy
Buildings and structures in the Province of Pesaro and Urbino